

NCAA Division 1 
Seasons played in each NCAA Division I program listed alongside player name. Player position in parentheses: F = forward, D = defenceman, G = goaltender.

College Hockey America (CHA) 

Mercyhurst University Lakers

 Katariina Soikkanen (D), 2006–07
 Emma Nuutinen (F), 2017–2020
 Vilma Tanskanen (F), 2017–2019
 Jenna Silvonen (G), 2019–2022

Niagara University Purple Eagles

 Venla Hovi  (F), 2007–08

Robert Morris University Colonials

 Meeri Räisänen (G), 2010–11

ECAC Hockey 
Cornell University Big Red

 Tiina Juvonen (F), 1999–2000

Quinnipiac University Bobcats

 Heidi Tallqvist (F), 2004–05
 Anna Kilponen (D), 2017–2019

Rensselaer Polytechnic Institute Engineers

 Heidi Niskanen  (D), 2013–2016

Hockey East 
Providence College Friars

 Mari Pehkonen (F), 2006–2009

University of Connecticut Huskies

 Viivi Vaattovaara, 2013–14

University of Maine Black Bears

 Ida Kuoppala (F), 2019–

University of New Hampshire Wildcats

 Vilma Vaattovaara (G), 2012–2016

University of Vermont Catamounts

 Saana Valkama (F), 2015–2019
 Sini Karjalainen (D), 2018–2022
 Krista Parkkonen (D), 2022–

Western Collegiate Hockey Association (WCHA) 

Minnesota State University Mavericks

 Nina Tikkinen (F), 2007–2011
 Emmi Leinonen (F), 2008–2012

Ohio State University Buckeyes

 Emma Terho  (D), 2000–2004
 Minttu Tuominen (D), 2009–2013
 Eve Savander (D), 2018–2022
 Sara Säkkinen (F), 2018–2022

St. Cloud State University Huskies

 Suvi Ollikainen (F), 2015–2019
 Jenniina Nylund (F), 2018–2022
 Sanni Ahola (G), 2020–
 Linnea Melotindos (F), 2020–2021

University of Minnesota Golden Gophers

 Mira Jalosuo (D), 2009–2013
 Noora Räty (G), 2009–2013
 Nelli Laitinen (D), 2022–

University of Minnesota Duluth Bulldogs

 Tuula Puputti (G), 1997–2002
 Hanne Sikiö (F), 1999–2003
 Jenni Venho (D), 1999–2001
 Satu Kiipeli (D), 2000–2004
 Sanna Peura (F), 2000–2001
 Nora Tallus (F), 2001–2005
 Anna-Kaisa Lemberg (G), 2003–2005
 Suvi Vacker, 2003–2007
 Mari Pehkonen (F), 2005–2006
 Heidi Pelttari (D), 2006–2009
 Mariia Posa (D), 2009–2012
 Saara Niemi  (F), 2006–2010
 Noora Jaakkola (D), 2010–2012
 Tea Villilä (D), 2011–2015
 Eveliina Mäkinen  (G), 2014

University of North Dakota Fighting Hawks

 Michelle Karvinen (F), 2011–2014
 Susanna Tapani (F), 2013–14
 Anna Kilponen (D), 2015–2017
 Vilma Tanskanen (F), 2015–2017
 Emma Nuutinen (D), 2016–17

NCAA Division III 
Seasons played in each NCAA Division III program listed alongside player name. Player position in parentheses: F = forward, D = defenceman, G = goaltender.

Northern Collegiate Hockey Association (NCHA) 
St. Norbert College Green Knights

Lotta Haarala (D), 2010–2012

Northeast Women's Hockey League (NEWHL) 

Buffalo State College Bengals

 Viivi Vaattovaara (D), 2014–2017
SUNY Canton Kangaroos

 Iida Laitinen (F), 2020–

U Sports 
Seasons played in each U Sports program listed alongside player name. Player position in parentheses: F = forward, D = defenceman, G = goaltender.

University of Manitoba Bisons

 Venla Hovi  (F), 2015–2018
Miressa Mäkelä (F), 2021–22

York University Lions

 Sari Krooks (F), 1996–1997

See also 

 Women's ice hockey in Finland

References

External links 

 NCAA Division I (W) at Elite Prospects
 NCAA Division III (W) at Elite Prospects
 USports (W) at EliteProspects.com

College women's ice hockey players in the United States
U Sports women's ice hockey
Women's ice hockey in Finland